Bishop of Montreal may refer to:

 the Anglican Bishop of the Diocese of Montreal
 the Roman Catholic Archbishop of the Archdiocese of Montreal